Aldehyde dehydrogenases are a group of enzymes that catalyse the oxidation of aldehydes.

Aldehyde dehydrogenase may also refer to:

 Aldehyde dehydrogenase (FAD-independent)
 Aldehyde dehydrogenase (NAD(P)+)
 Aldehyde dehydrogenase (NAD+)
 Aldehyde dehydrogenase (NADP+)
 Aldehyde dehydrogenase (pyrroloquinoline-quinone)

See also
 

 Biology disambiguation pages